Kalasha language may refer to:

Kalasha-ala, any of several Nuristani languages of Afghanistan, especially Waigali
Chitral Kalasha language, a Dardic language of the Chitral Valley of Pakistan